Invershin is a scattered village in the Parish of Creich,  south of Lairg and  north of Bonar Bridge in the south of Sutherland in the Scottish Highlands and is in the Scottish council area of Highland.

Invershin is located close to the junction of the River Shin and the River Oykel. Lands of "Inverchyn" or "Inverchen" are mentioned in 13th century documents. The motte remains of Invershin Castle are located near Invershin.

It is served by Invershin railway station, and is the location of the Shin Railway Viaduct which carries the Far North Line across the Kyle of Sutherland. In 2000, a footbridge was added to the northern side of the viaduct and is part of National Cycle Network Route 1.

References 

Populated places in Sutherland